Bosara janae is a moth in the family Geometridae. It is found on Sulawesi.

The length of the forewings is about 9 mm. The ground colour is greyish.

Etymology
The species is named in honour of the wife of the author.

References

Moths described in 1999
Eupitheciini
Moths of Indonesia